Hyun Soong-jong (26 February 1919 – 25 May 2020) was a South Korean politician. He served as the 22nd Prime Minister of South Korea from 8 October 1992 to 25 February 1993. Hyun died on 25 May 2020 at the age of 101.

References

1919 births
2020 deaths
Prime Ministers of South Korea
People from South Pyongan
South Korean centenarians
Men centenarians
Seoul National University alumni